Saurabh Dubey (born 1 December 1988) is an Indian cricketer. He made his Twenty20 debut for Uttar Pradesh in the 2015–16 Syed Mushtaq Ali Trophy on 2 January 2016.

References

External links
 

1988 births
Living people
Indian cricketers
Uttar Pradesh cricketers
Sportspeople from Gorakhpur